Hele Everaus (born 5 January 1953 in Tartu) is an Estonian medical scientist, physician and politician. She has been member of XIV Riigikogu.

In 1977 she graduated from University of Tartu in medicine (cum laude). Since 2000, she has been a professor of oncology-hematology at the University of Tartu; since 2017, a consultant and professor emeritus.

1993-2000 she was the head of the Children's Clinic Haematological Intensive Care Unit. 2000-2016 she was the head of Haematology and Oncology Clinic.

1996–2019 she was a member of Tartu City Council.

Since 1994 she is a member of Estonian Reform Party.

References

Living people
1953 births
Estonian women physicians
Women hematologists
Women oncologists
Estonian Reform Party politicians
Women members of the Riigikogu
Members of the Riigikogu, 2019–2023
21st-century Estonian politicians
University of Tartu alumni
Academic staff of the University of Tartu
Politicians from Tartu
People from Tartu
21st-century Estonian women politicians